Serbian inventions and discoveries are objects, processes or techniques invented or discovered by Serbian people.

List

See also
List of Serbian inventors and discoverers

Notes

References

Lists of inventions or discoveries
 
Inventions and discoveries